Bagua, or "ba gua", is a fundamental philosophical concept in Chinese culture.

Bagua may also refer to:
 Baguazhang (Ba gua zhang), shortly Bagua, a Chinese martial art based on Ba gua's principles
 Bakkwa, a salty-sweet dried meat product from China similar to pork jerky
 Bagua, Peru, a town in Amazonas Region, Peru
 Bagua District, a district in Bagua Province, Peru
 Bagua Province, province in Amazonas Region, Peru
 Bagua Grande, a town in Amazonas Region, Peru
 Plain of Bagua, Peru
 Bagua Anantapur, a town in Rangpur Division, Bangladesh